Kan-Juice is a remix album by Japanese recording artist Arisa Mizuki, released through Nippon Columbia on April 1, 1994. The album features a selection of seven songs from Mizuki's first two studio albums, Arisa and Arisa II: Shake Your Body for Me, remixed by famous Japanese DJs and musicians, including former Pizzicato Five frontman Yasuharu Konishi.

Kan-Juice debuted at number 27 on the Oricon Weekly Albums chart with 9,570 copies in its first week, becoming Mizuki's first album to peak outside the top twenty.

Commercial performance 
Kan-Juice debuted on the Oricon Weekly Albums chart at number 27 with 9,570 copies sold in its first week. The album charted for three weeks and has sold a total of 21,570 copies.

Track listing

Charts and sales

References 

1994 remix albums
Alisa Mizuki albums
Nippon Columbia albums
Japanese-language albums